The 2012–13 Chiapas season was the 66th professional season of Mexico's top-flight football league and Jaguares de Chiapas final season in the Liga MX. The season is split into two tournaments—the Torneo Apertura and the Torneo Clausura—each with identical formats and each contested by the same eighteen teams. Chiapas began their season on July 20, 2012, against UANL, Chiapas played their homes games on Fridays at 7:30pm local time. Chiapas did not qualify to the final phase in either the Apertura or Clausura tournament.

Torneo Apertura

Squad

Regular season

Apertura 2012 results

Goalscorers

Results

Results summary

Results by round

Apertura 2012 Copa MX

Group stage

Apertura results

Goalscorers

Results

Results by round

Torneo Clausura

Squad

Regular season

Clausura 2013 results

Chiapas did not qualify to the Final Phase

Goalscorers

Results

Results summary

Results by round

Clausura 2013 Copa MX

Group stage

Clausura results

Knockout stage

Goalscorers

Results by round

Notes

References

Mexican football clubs 2012–13 season